Tatsuyoshi (written:  or ) is a masculine Japanese given name. Notable people with the name include:

, Japanese speed skater
, Japanese baseball player

Tatsuyoshi is also a Japanese surname. Notable people with the surname include:
, Japanese boxer

Japanese-language surnames
Japanese masculine given names